Eupithecia placida is a moth in the family Geometridae. It is found in China.

References

Moths described in 1984
placida
Moths of Asia